NA-243 constituency, in Pakistan, may refer to:

 NA-252 (Karachi West-V), formerly NA-243 Karachi-V
 NA-243 (Karachi East-II)